This is a list of women historians categorized by their area of study. See also List of historians and List of historians by area of study.

By time period

Ancient history 

 Leonie Archer (born 1955) – Graeco-Roman Palestine
 Mary Beard (born 1955)
 Halet Çambel (1916, Berlin, Germany- 2014, İstanbul, Türkiye) Archaeologist- Historian, Ancient Anatolian
 Yuliya Kolosovskaya (1920–2002) – Roman history and Roman provinces of the Danube
 Barbara Levick (born 1931) – Roman emperors
 Heleen Sancisi-Weerdenburg (1944–2000) – specializing in classical Greek and Achaemenid history
 Mariya Sergeyenko (1891–1987) – Roman agriculture and daily life
 Elena Shtaerman (1914–1991) – Roman history
 Lily Ross Taylor (1886-1969) - Roman history

Medieval history 

 Elisabeth van Houts (born 1952) – medieval European history
 Rosamond McKitterick (born 1949) – Frankish and Carolingian history
 Anneke B. Mulder-Bakker (born 1940) – specialist in the position of women during the Middle Ages
 Mayke de Jong (born 1950) – political and religious history of the early Middle Ages
 Eileen Power (1889–1940) – Middle Ages
 Miri Rubin (born 1956) – social and religious history, 1100–1500
 Catrien Santing (born 1958) – cultural history and medical history in the late-medieval and early-modern Low Countries
 Päivi Setälä (1943–2014) – women's history
 Retha Warnicke (born 1939)

By nation or geographical area

North America

History of Canada 

 Charlotte Gray (born 1948) – popular histories
 Agnes Laut (1871 – 1936)

See also List of Canadian historians.

History of the Caribbean 

 Aviva Chomsky (born 1957)
 Lucille M. Mair (1924–2009)

History of the United States 

 Holly Brewer (born 1964) – early American History
 Drew Gilpin Faust (born 1947) – Civil War, culture of death, and the Confederacy
 Elizabeth Fox-Genovese (1941–2007) – Southern slavery, women's history
 Doris Kearns Goodwin (born 1943) - U.S. presidents, won a Pulitzer Prize in 1995 for No Ordinary Time: Franklin and Eleanor Roosevelt: The Home Front in World War II
 Pauline Maier (1938–2013) – late Colonial, Revolution, Constitution
 Irma Tam Soong (1912–2001) – history of Chinese immigration in Hawaii
 Betty Wood (1945–2021) – early American history

Latin America

History of Latin America 
See also :Category:Historians of Latin America

 Aviva Chomsky (born 1957)
 Ann Farnsworth-Alvear
 Jane Gilmer Landers (born 1947)

Brazil 

 Lilia Moritz Schwarcz (born 1957)

Peru 

 María Rostworowski (1915–2016)

Europe

History of Europe 

 Patricia Clavin (born 1964) – international relations and transnational relations
 Elizabeth Eisenstein (1923–2016) – early printing and transitions in media
 Julia P. Gelardi – royal history of 19th and 20th centuries
 Elisabeth van Houts (born 1952) – medieval European history
 Aira Kemiläinen (1919–2006) – European history of ideas
 Laura Kolbe (born in 1957) 
 Effie Pedaliu – history of Italian war crimes and Cold war
 Charlotte Zeepvat – royal history of 19th and 20th centuries

History of Belgium 

 Sophie de Schaepdrijver (born 1961) – World War I

History of England and Britain 

 Leonie Archer (born 1955) – British
 Karen Armstrong (born 1944) – religious
 Linda Colley (born 1949) – 18th century
 Susan Doran – Elizabethan
 Antonia Fraser (born 1932) – 17th century
 Ruth Goodman (born 1963) – early modern
 Ragnhild Hatton (1913–1995) – biographer of King Charles XII of Sweden and King George I of Great Britain
 Lotte Hellinga (born 1932) – book historian, expert in early printing, expert in the work of the fifteenth-century printer William Caxton.
 Gertrude Himmelfarb (1922–2019) – social and cultural history of the Victorian period
 Retha Warnicke (born 1939) – Tudor history and gender issues
 Cicely Veronica Wedgwood (1910–1997) – British
 G. M. Young (1882-1959) - Victorian England

History of the British Empire 

 Antoinette Burton (born 1961)

History of Croatia 

 Nada Klaić (1920–1988)
 Mirjana Gross (1922–2012)

History of Finland 

 Marjatta Hietala (born 1943)  – urban history, history of innovations
 Riitta Nikula (born 1944) – generalist historian of Finnish architecture
 Jully Ramsay (1865—1919) – first woman genealogist in Finland, pioneer of Finnish genealogy

History of France 

 Natalie Zemon Davis (born 1928) – early modern France
 Alma Söderhjelm (1870 – 1949) – editing the correspondence of the French Queen Marie Antoinette with the Swedish nobleman von Fersen and with some French revolutionaries

 See also List of historians of the French Revolution.

History of Germany 

 Celia Applegate – music history and nationalism
 Gisela Bock (born 1942)
 Luise Gerbing (1855–1927), history of Thuringia
 Deborah Hertz (born 1949)
 Claudia Koonz (born 1940)
 Wendy Lower (born 1965) – history of National Socialism

History of Ireland 

 Mary Bonaventure Browne (after 1610–after 1670), Poor Clare and historian
 Ann Buckley
 Kathleen Hughes (1926–1977)

History of Italy 

 Alessandra Kersevan (born 1950) – Italian concentration camps
 Effie Pedaliu – Italian war crimes
 Lucy Riall (born 1962) – The Risorgimento, Garibaldi, Sicily

History of Moldova/Bessarabia 

 Rebecca Haynes

History of the Netherlands 

 Henrica van Erp (1480–1548) – monastery life

History of Romania 

 Irina Livezeanu (born 1952)

History of Russia 

 Patricia Kennedy Grimsted (born 1935) – post-Soviet archives
 Lindsey Hughes (1949–2007) - C17th and C18th
 Anne Applebaum (born 1964) – Gulag history
 Sheila Fitzpatrick (born 1941) – everyday life under Stalinism

History of Scotland 

 Rosalind Mitchison (1919–2002)
 Jenny Wormald (1942–2015)

History of Slovakia 

 Gabriela Dudeková (born 1968) – social policy of Austria-Hungary; situation of POWs and civilians in World War I; history of feminism and gender studies
 Zora Mintalová – Zubercová (born 1950) – food history and material culture of Central Europe

History of Slovenia 

 Alessandra Kersevan (born 1950) – Italian concentration camps
 Marta Verginella (born 1960) – history of the Slovene minority in Italy (1920–1947)

History of Spain 

 Ida Altman (born 1950) – Early modern Spain, colonial Latin America
 Julia Pavón (born 1968) – medieval history of Navarra

History of Sweden 

 Ragnhild Hatton (1913–1995) – biographer of King Charles XII of Sweden and King George I of Great Britain

History of Yugoslavia 

 Barbara Jelavich (1923–1995) – wrote extensively on Balkan history, along with her husband Charles Jelavich
 Catherine Samary – author of Yugoslavia Dismembered
 Stephen Schwartz (born 1948)

Europe and Asia

Asia

Middle East 

 Caroline Finkel
 Hamilton Alexander Rosskeen Gibb (1895–1971) – Editor, The Encyclopaedia of Islam
 Heleen Sancisi-Weerdenburg (1944–2000) – Achaemenid history

Central Asia 

 Lola Dodkhudoeva (born 1951), Tajikistani historian specialising in medieval Central Asian affairs
 Svetlana Gorshenina (born 1969), Uzbek specialist on Pre-Islamic Central Asia

South Asia

History of the Indian Subcontinent 

 Ayesha Jalal (born 1956)
 Romila Thapar (born 1931)
 Barbara Metcalf (born 1941)
 Tanika Sarkar
 Barbara Ramusack (born 1937)

Far East

History of Japan 

 Gail Lee Bernstein (born 1939)
 Carol Gluck (born 1941)
 Susan Hanley (born 1939)
 Joyce Lebra (1925-2021)
 Amy Stanley (born 1978)

History of China 

 Ann Paludan (1928–2014) – ancient China

History of Hong Kong 

 Elizabeth Sinn Yuk Yee (born 1961)

Africa 

 Jocelyne Dakhlia (born 1959) – political and cultural history of Islam in the Maghreb

History of the Serers 

 Marguerite Dupire (1920–2015), French scholar of Serer religion and history

By general category

Architectural history 

 Riitta Nikula (born 1944) – generalist historian of Finnish architecture

Art history 

 Nurhan Atasoy (born 1934, Tokat, Türkiye) – Turkish and Islamic Art History
 Anna Kortelainen (born in 1968)
 Catherine Mason – British computer and digital art history
 Alena Potůčková (1953–2018) – Czech art history

Christianity 

 Barbara Thiering (1930–2015) – rediscovered the "Pesher technique"

Economic history 

 Leah Boustan
 Claudia Goldin (born 1946)
 Susan Howson (born 1945)
 Naomi Lamoreaux (born 1950)

Egyptology 

 Penelope Wilson

Environmental history 

 Nancy C. Unger – American women in the environmental movement

Food history 

 Zora Mintalová – Zubercová (born 1950)

Gender history 

 Francisca de Haan (fl. 1998-) – Central, Eastern and South Eastern European Women's and Gender History
 Johanna Naber (1859–1941) –  influential women and the women's movement
 Marysa Navarro (born 1934)  –  feminism
 Kaari Utrio – women and children
 Retha Warnicke (born 1939) – gender issues

History of ideas, culture, literature, and philosophy 

 Marjatta Hietala (born 1943)  – urban history, history of innovations
 Aira Kemiläinen (1919–2006) – European history of ideas

History of international relations 

 Ragnhild Hatton (1913–1995) – historian of 17th- and 18th-century international relations

History of science and technology 

 Evelyn Fox Keller (born 1936) – science and gender, biology

Holocaust 

 Ruth Bettina Birn (born 1952)
 Catherine Chatterley
 Danuta Czech (1922–2004)
 Lucy Dawidowicz (1915–1990)
 Deborah Dwork
 Leo Eitinger (1912–1996)
 Barbara Engelking (born 1962)
 Esther Farbstein (born 1946)
 Susanne Heim (born 1955)
 Deborah Lipstadt (born 1947)
 Dina Porat (born 1943)
 Livia Rothkirchen (1922–2013)
 Sybille Steinbacher (born 1966)
 Rebecca Wittmann (born 1970)
 Hanna Yablonka (born 1950)
 Leni Yahil (1912–2007)

Military history 

Beth Bailey

Mormonism 

 Fawn M. Brodie (1915–1981)

Naval history 

 Ulane Bonnel (1918–2006)

Social history 

 Gabriela Dudeková (born 1968)
 Ruth Goodman (born 1963) – early modern, British social history

Biography 

 Elizabeth Gaskell (1810–1865) - Charlotte Brontë
 Ragnhild Hatton (1913–1995) – biographer of King Charles XII of Sweden and King George I of Great Britain
 Susan Quinn (born 1940) - Marie Curie

References 

Lists of historians
Women historians
Lists of women writers